The Rock 'n' Roll Arizona Marathon is a marathon held annually in Arizona on the Sunday before Martin Luther King, Jr. Day that links three cities of the Phoenix Metropolitan Area: Phoenix, Scottsdale, and Tempe.  The marathon race can be used to obtain a qualifying time for the Boston Marathon.  The race weekend also includes a half marathon, a 10K run, and a 5K run.

The competition attracts tens of thousands of runners each year; more than 32,000 competed in 2010. The prize money for winning either the men's or the women's marathon race is US$1,000.

Like the original Rock 'n' Roll Marathon in San Diego, it is organized by the IRONMAN Group, part of Wanda Sports Holdings. It was sponsored until 2015 by P. F. Chang's China Bistro.

History 

The 2021 edition of the race was cancelled due to the coronavirus pandemic.

World record 

The event is noted for the half-marathon world record set by Haile Gebrselassie on January 15, 2006, who ran the second half of the marathon course in 58 minutes and 55 seconds. This part of the marathon course is slightly downhill, but is still within IAAF requirements for world record status. Gebrselassie's record stood for a year, until it was lowered by two seconds on  February 9, 2007 by Samuel Wanjiru at Ras al-Khaimah.

Course 

In prior years, both race courses started in Phoenix, however, in 2012 the courses were split. The start of the marathon is located in downtown Phoenix near the CityScape Plaza. The half marathon and newly added 10k start in Tempe. All races finish in the city of Tempe at the Tempe Beach Park. The event also includes wheelchair races starting 10 minutes and 5 minutes before the marathon and half-marathon races. The average start line temperature is around 40 °F (4 °C), and the average daily high temperature is between 50 °F and 70 °F (10 °C-21 °C).

Along the route are over 40 high school cheerleading teams and 70 bands who perform for the runners. Later in the evening there is a concert held in Tempe for all the runners, volunteers and spectators.

Race records 

Simon Bairu set a new men's race record for the half marathon, on January 17, 2010, with a time of 1 hour, 2 minutes, 47 seconds which was well under the previous race record of 1 hour, 4 minutes, 35 seconds set by the late Ryan Shay in 2004.

Deena Kastor set a new women's race record for the half marathon, also on January 17, 2010, with a time of 1 hour, 9 minutes, 43 seconds which also broke the state record.

Winners 

Key: Course record (in bold)

Marathon

Half marathon

Wheelchair race

See also
 Rock 'n' Roll Marathon Series
 List of marathon races in North America

References

External links
 Official website of the Rock n' Roll Arizona Marathon
 Rock n' Roll Arizona Marathon at marathoninfo.free.fr
 Marathon route

Recurring sporting events established in 2004
Marathons in the United States
Sports in Phoenix, Arizona